Ara Dinkjian (born June 18, 1958) is an Armenian-American musician. He is the founder of the band Night Ark. Dinkjian is considered one of the top oud players in the world, his compositions have been recorded in thirteen different languages, which include the multi-platinum hit "Dinata" which was performed in the closing ceremonies of the 2004 Olympic Games in Athens.

Dinkjian has written songs for Eleftheria Arvanitaki, and Sezen Aksu ("Vazgeçtim", "Sarışın", "Yine Mi Çiçek", "Hoş Geldin", among others). Turkish singers Gülşen, Kibariye, Mine Koşan, Ahmet Kaya, Coşkun Sabah, Burcu Güneş have recorded his songs.

Early life
Born in New Jersey to Armenian parents, Dinkjian made his professional debut at age five playing on the doumbag at the 1964 New York World's Fair, where he accompanied John Berberian and George Mgrdichian. His earliest professional musical experience was accompanying his father Onnik Dinkjian, a renowned singer of Armenian folk music and liturgical chants. He received a scholarship to The Hartt School, a performing arts college in Hartford, Connecticut. Dinkjian learned several western and eastern instruments (piano, guitar, darbuka) and in 1980 graduated from the Hartt College of Music, earning the country’s first and only special degree in the instrument for which he has become most well-known, the oud.

Career
Throughout his musical life, Ara has continued to develop a highly personal compositional style which blends his eastern and western roots. In 1985, to help realize these compositions and musical concepts, Ara formed his instrumental quartet, Night Ark, which recorded four CDs for RCA/BMG and Universal/PolyGram.

Night Ark’s recordings and world-wide concert tours were highly influential for musicians and music lovers throughout the world because they demonstrated how music can be progressive and creative while still retaining the dignity and soul of one’s culture. Members of his band Night Ark included Arto Tunçboyacıyan on the percussion as well as pianist/composer Armen Donelian and Marc Johnson. He is accompanied by Zohar Fresco on percussion and Adi Rennert on keyboards.

In 2002, Dinkjian was chosen to represent Armenia in the First International Meeting Of The Oud, where twelve of the world’s top oud players gathered in Thessaloniki, Greece for three days of solo concerts, master classes, and exchange of information.

He has appeared throughout the world on concert stages, oud festivals, seminars, and master classes, performing in 24 different countries. His CDs An Armenian In America, Voice Of Armenians, and Peace On Earth were recorded live at the 2005, 2006, and 2007 Jerusalem International Oud Festivals. At the 2008 Oud Festival in Israel, he recorded an album with Sokratis Sinopoulos – lyra (Greece), Tamer Pinarbasi – kanun (Turkey), Rimon Haddad – bass (Palestina) and Zohar Fresco – percussion (Israel), and named it Peace on Earth.

Ara has also released a solo oud recording titled Conversations With Manol (2013), as well as Finding Songs (2013), which features 12 new compositions performed by the Ara Dinkjian Quartet.  Other releases include Diyarbekiri Hokin (The Soul of Dikranagerd) which is a collaboration with his father Onnik, as well as 1915–2015 Truth & Hope, commemorating the 100 year anniversary of the Armenian genocide.

Ara has collaborated with kanunist Tamer Pınarbaşı and clarinetist Ismail Lumanovski in unique chamber-music style arrangements of ethnic folk, pop, classical, jazz, and original compositions. Collectively known as The Secret Trio, they released their first CD titled Soundscapes in 2012, and their second CD titled Three Of Us in 2015. Dinkjian’s latest released is Live at Princeton University, which features both The Secret Trio and The New York Gypsy All Stars.

Festivals

Dinkjian has performed in several festivals, mostly in Israel, where his music is very popular:

 Ethnic music festival: Songs of the oud
 Jerusalem International Oud Festival
 ArmenStock 2004
 Días del laúd Festival
 1980 Montreux Jazz Festival

Discography

Night Ark
 1986 - Picture, RCA/Novus
 1988 - Moments, RCA/Novus
 1998 - In Wonderland, PolyGram
 2000 - Petals on your Path, EmArcy
 2000 - Treasures, Traditional Crossroads

Ara Dinkjian - solo and with friends
 1995 Gypsy Fire, Traditional Crossroads
 1996 Tears of Dignity, Libra Music
 1996 Onno 1948 - 1996, D. Stove Music
 2006 An Armenian In America, Krikor Music
 2008 Peace on Earth, Krikor Music
 2012 Sounscapes, Traditional Crossroads
 2013 Finding Songs, Krikor Music
 2013 Conversations with Manol, Kalan Music
 2015 Three of Us, with Secret Trio, Kalan Music
 2015 1915-2015 Hakikat Umut / Truth Hope, Kalan Music

References 

1958 births
Living people
American people of Armenian descent
American oud players
American multi-instrumentalists
University of Hartford Hartt School alumni